Gnaeus Minicius Faustinus Sextus Julius Severus was an accomplished Roman general of the 2nd century. He also held the office of suffect consul in the last three months of 127 with Lucius Aemilius Juncus as his colleague.

Biography
Julius Severus was born in Colonia Claudia Aequum, Dalmatia, today Čitluk, a small village in modern-day Bosnia-Herzegovina.

He served as Governor of Moesia; he was appointed Governor of Britain around 131.

In 133 and to circa 135, he was transferred to 14th legate of Judaea, to help suppress the Bar Kokhba revolt there. Because of his military reputation, historians have seen him as a troubleshooter, sent to troublesome provinces to bring peace through war and his presence has been taken as indication of unrest in Britain at the time. There is no archaeological evidence to suggest fighting in Britain under his governorship although a reference by the orator Fronto to many soldiers dying in Britain under Hadrian's reign may refer to trouble at this time.

"Soon [132], however, all Judaea had been stirred up, and the Jews everywhere were showing signs of disturbance ... Hadrian sent against them his best generals. The first of these was Julius Severus, who was dispatched from Britain, where he was governor, against the Jews." – Cassius Dio, History of Rome LXIX.xiii.1-2 - Epitome of Xiphilinus

References

 A.R. Birley, The Roman Government of Britain (Oxford: Oxford University Press, 2005), pp. 129–133. 
 E. Dabrowa, The Governors of Roman Syria from Augustus to Septimius Severus, 1981, pp. 94–96
 W. Eck,"The Bar Kokhba Revolt:  The Roman Point of View", Journal of Roman Studies 89 (1999), pp. 79–80
 W. Eck, "Hadrian, the Bar Kokhba Revolt, and the Epigraphic Transmission", in: The Bar Kokhba war reconsidered : new perspectives on the second Jewish revolt against Rome, Peter Schäfer (editor) (Tübingen: Mohr Siebeck, 2003), pp. 168–169
 P. Weiß, Neue Militärdiplome für den Exercitus von Britannia, Zeitschrift für Papyrologie und Epigraphik 156 (2006), pp. 245–254
 Eck, W., Holder, P., Pangerl, A., A Diploma for the Army of Britain in 132 and Hadrian’s Return to Rome from the East, Zeitschrift für Papyrologie und Epigraphik 174 (2010), pp. 189–200
 A. R. Birley, Viri Militares Moving from West to East in Two Crisis Years (AD 133 and 162), The Impact of Mobility and Migration in the Roman Empire, E. Lo Cascio and L. E. Tacoma (eds.), Leiden, 2017, pp. 55–79

2nd-century Roman governors of Judaea
2nd-century Romans
Ancient Roman generals
Bar Kokhba revolt
Severus, Sextus
Roman governors of Britain
Roman governors of Lower Moesia
Suffect consuls of Imperial Rome